Jamahiriya Democratique et Populaire de Sauvage is the third studio album by American post-punk band Savage Republic, released in 1988 by Fundamental Records. It was reissued on Mobilization Records with bonus instrumental tracks in 2002.

Track listing

Personnel
Adapted from the Jamahiriya Democratique et Populaire de Sauvage liner notes.

Savage Republic
Philip Drucker (as Jackson Del Rey) – keyboards, guitar, percussion, vocals
Thom Furhmann – bass guitar, guitar, vocals
Greg Grunke – bass guitar, guitar, vocals
Brad Laner – drums, keyboards, percussion
Bruce Licher – monotone guitar, bass guitar, vocals, art direction
Ethan Port – guitar, percussion, vocals

Production and additional personnel
Vitus Mataré – production
Abe Perlstein – photography
Savage Republic – production

Release history

References

External links 
 

1988 albums
Savage Republic albums